Patanga  is a 1949 Indian Hindi-language romantic comedy film. It was the first film produced and distributed by Varma Films; yet,It was the seventh highest grossing Indian film of 1949. The film was directed by H. S. Rawail based on a story written by his wife Anjana Rawail. Rajendra Kumar, who would  become one of the leading actors in Indian cinema, worked in Patanga as an assistant to director H.S. Rawail  and also had a cameo in the film.
A duet sung against the backdrop of WW2, "Mere Piya Gaye Rangoon", picturised on actor Gope and lead heroine Nigar Sultana became popular.   The playback singers for the song were C. Ramchandra, who also composed the music for the film, and Shamshad Begum. The cast included Nigar Sultana, Shyam, Yakub, Gope, Purnima, Shyama, Randhir and Mohana.

Plot
The plot revolves around the life of Raja (Yakub), a traffic constable.  One day, while on his job, he gets distracted by the song being sung by Rani (Nigar Sultana), a street songstress, and leaves his traffic station.  This led to a serious traffic accident and Raja is suspended from his job for a year without pay.  Rani decides to help Raja and both of them find acting jobs at Gope Theater run by Natharam Gope (Gope).

All seems to be going well with Raja and Rani until Shyam (Shyam), the son of a wealthy Jagirdar (landlord) enters the picture. While watching Rani on stage, Shyam falls in love with her.  So begins the classic love triangle that emerges when two men are in love with the same woman.  What complicates this love triangle is that Raja just cannot get himself to let Rani know that he is in love with her and seeking more than a friendship.  Further complicating this love triangle is that Shyam is already betrothed to Purnima (Purnima) and his love for Rani does not sit well with her.  The film progresses with the resolution of the conflicts that arise in this complex love triangle.

Cast
 Shyam as Shyam
 Nigar Sultana as Rani
 Yakub as Raja
 Gope as Nathuram Gope 
 Purnima as Purnima
 Shyama as Mali's Wife
 Cuckoo as dancer
 Raj Mehra as watchman of Gope Theatre
 Iftekhar as Gardener
 Randhir as Shyam's friend
 Mohana as Jwala
 Ramesh Sinha
 Rajendra Kumar
 Khairati as Bhusham M.A

Music
"Mera Piya Gaye Rangoon" sung by Shamshad Begum became an evergreen hit.

References

External links
 

1949 films
1940s Hindi-language films
Films directed by H. S. Rawail
Films scored by C. Ramchandra
Indian romantic comedy films
1949 romantic comedy films
Indian black-and-white films